Major minor may refer to:

Music
 Major and minor, the adjectives used to describe the tonality of a scale, key, or chord
 Major-minor tonality, a system of music in which specific hierarchical pitch relationships are based on a key "center" or tonic
 Major/minor composition, a musical composition that begins in a major key and ends in a minor key
 Major/Minor, an album by Thrice

Other
 Academic majors and minors, the primary and secondary academic disciplines to which an undergraduate student formally commits.
Major Minor Records, a record label started by Phil Solomon in 1966 and later bought by EMI
 Major Minor's Majestic March, a 2009 music video game for the Nintendo Wii
 The Major and the Minor, a 1942 romantic comedy film directed by Billy Wilder
 Major Minor, a character in the cartoon Snagglepuss
 Major minor, a species of fly in the genus Major

See also
 Major (disambiguation)
 Minor (disambiguation)